"Let's Go to Church (Next Sunday Morning)" is a country music song written by Steve Allen, sung by Margaret Whiting and Jimmy Wakely, and released on the Capitol label. In April 1950, it reached No. 2 on the country best seller chart. It spent 10 weeks on the charts and was the No. 16 best selling country record of 1950.

See also
 Billboard Top Country & Western Records of 1950

References

Jimmy Wakely songs
Margaret Whiting songs
1950 songs